Italy national under-21 football B team is the Italy national football team that represents Serie B at competitions and is controlled by the Lega B. Due to sponsorship reasons, the team was credited as Under-21 Serie B TIM until 2010.

They are the B team and feeder team of Italy national under-21 football team, which occasionally plays against other national under-21 teams. Unlike the main team, the U21 Serie B selects players from Serie B only and was controlled by Lega Calcio (later Lega B) instead of Italian Football Federation (FIGC).

The team also plays against football clubs, Under-20 Lega Pro (selected players from Lega Pro), Serie B Foreigners Best XI, The Football League under-21 team (in 2006) and internal friendlies, which the team split into blue and white team and against each other.

Recent fixture
Only matches played against national teams were listed.
28 November 2012  Russian First League Selection 0-0 draw
 22 October 2012  Selection 5-0 
15 November 2011  Russian First League Selection 2-1 won
25 October 2011  Serbian First League Selection 1-0 won
30 March 2011  Serbian First League Selection 2-0 won
6 February 2006:  (result unknown)
17 March 2005:  3-2 won
30 March 2004:  3-2 won
12 February 2003:  2–1 won
 26 January 2002:  0-0 draw

Players
The team had same age limit as the Italy U21 team. For 2014–2015 season, players born on or after 1 January 1992 are eligible to play. A feeder team of U21 team, some players were called up to U21 Serie B team before making their débuts for Italy U21.

The teams consist of players loaned to Serie B from Serie A clubs, youth products of Serie B and young talents signed by Serie B clubs from Lega Pro. Some players are scouted by Serie A clubs after good performances in Serie B.

Notable players
Players who won full caps or received a call-up for Italy senior team
Andrea Barzagli (b. 1981)
Salvatore Bocchetti (b. 1986)
Leonardo Bonucci (b. 1987)
Mattia Cassani (b. 1983)
Andrea Esposito (b. 1986)
Daniele Gastaldello (b. 1983)
Christian Maggio (b. 1982)
Cristian Molinaro (b. 1983)
Simone Pepe (b. 1983)
Giacomo Bonaventura (b. 1989)

See also
Italy national football C team

References

External links
 Official Site 

under-21 B team
Serie B
European national B association football teams